The Martyrs of Natal were a group of 30 Roman Catholic people of Colonial Brazil – two of them priests – killed in the northern part of the colony in massacres that a large group of Dutch Calvinists led. One priest was a Colonial Brazilian Jesuit missionary, while the other priest was an evangelizer himself. The others were all lay Catholics, most of them anonymous members of the Church, some of them children.

The 30 individuals were beatified in Saint Peter's Square on 5 March 2000. Pope Francis – on 23 March 2017 – signed a decree that approved their canonization while waiving the miracle required for sainthood; the date was formalized at a gathering of cardinals on 20 April and the group was canonized as saints on 15 October 2017.

Lives and murders

Background
The Natal region was colonized after the Portuguese Catholics arrived but the Dutch Calvinists soon took over and spread their anti-Catholic sentiment across the region, while making persecution of all remaining Catholics an objective for them.

Despite the air of persecution some priests moved to the area in order to sustain the people in their faith.

André de Soveral

André de Soveral was born in Brazil in 1572. He was a professed member of the Society of Jesus, having entered the Jesuits in 1593 and making his period of novitiate in Bahia. He studied Latin – as well as the native language – and theological studies before being sent to the college in Olinda. His first experience in the missions was in Rio Grande do Norte in 1606 amongst the natives, for catechism lessons. In 1614 he was a parish priest in Cunhaú.

On 16 July 1645 – a Sunday – there were 69 people gathered in the chapel of Our Lady of the Candles for a Mass that Soveral presided over. It was just before the Eucharistic rite that Dutch soldiers attacked the chapel and murdered Soveral and a companion – Domingos Carvalho – along with others.

October massacre
On 3 October 1645 a total of 200 armed natives with their Dutch allies targeted and hacked to death 30 individuals including children and one priest. The leader of this group was the radical Calvinist Antonio Paraopaba. Mateus Moreira – a victim of the onslaught – cried out as he died: "Praise be the Blessed Sacrament".

Individuals

The 2 individuals killed on 16 July 1645 are:
 André de Soveral (b. 1572) – Jesuit priest
 Domingos Carvalho – layman

The 28 individuals killed on 3 October 1645 are:
 Ambrósio Francisco Ferro – priest
 Antônio Vilela – married layman
 A daughter of Vilela – young laywoman
 José do Porto – layman
 Francisco de Bastos – layman
 Diogo Pereira – layman
 João Lostau Navarro – layman
 Antônio Vilela Cid – layman
 Estêvão Machado de Miranda – married layman
 A daughter of de Miranda – young laywoman
 A daughter of de Miranda – young laywoman
 Vicente de Souza Pereira – layman
 Francisco Mendes Pereira – layman
 João da Silveira – layman
 Simão Correia – layman
 Antônio Baracho – layman
 Mateus Moreira – layman
 João Martins – layman
 7 lay companions of Martins
 Manuel Rodrigues de Moura – married layman
 The wife of Moura – married laywoman
 A daughter of Francisco Dias – laywoman

Canonization
The beatification process opened in Natal on 6 June 1989 after the Congregation for the Causes of Saints issued the official "nihil obstat" and titled them all as Servants of God. The diocesan process spanned from 1989 until 1994 and the C.C.S. later validated this process on 25 November 1994 before receiving the Positio in 1998.

The theologians approved the cause on 23 June 1998 as did the C.C.S. on 10 November 1998. Pope John Paul II confirmed that the group were all killed "in odium fidei" (in hated of the faith) and thus approved their beatifications. He presided over the beatification celebration in Saint Peter's Square on 5 March 2000.

Pope Francis had expressed in the past his closeness to this particular cause and expressed willingness to canonize them as saints. The C.C.S. met on 14 March 2017 to discuss the omission of the miracle needed for canonization and voiced their approval of that. The pope approved the canonization on 23 March 2017 in an official decree with the date formalized at a gathering of cardinals on 20 April; the group was canonized in Saint Peter's Square on 15 October 2017.

The postulator for this cause at the time of the canonization was Giovangiuseppe Califano.

References

External links
Hagiography Circle
Saints SQPN

Jesuit saints
Year of birth unknown
1645 deaths
17th-century Christian saints
17th-century Brazilian Jesuits
17th-century venerated Christians
17th-century Brazilian people
17th-century Roman Catholic martyrs
Beatifications by Pope John Paul II
Brazilian murder victims
17th-century Brazilian Roman Catholic priests
Brazilian Roman Catholic saints
Portuguese Roman Catholic saints
Canonizations by Pope Francis
Jesuit martyrs
Jesuit missionaries
Martyred Roman Catholic priests
Groups of Roman Catholic saints
Murdered Brazilian children
People from São Paulo
People murdered in Brazil